The Mildmay Monarchs were a senior hockey team based out of Mildmay, Ontario, Canada.  They played in the Western Ontario Athletic Association Senior Hockey League.

Championships
The Monarchs, who played in the WOAA from 2003–2007, never won a WOAA Championship, and no previous Mildmay team has ever been WOAA champions either.

Mildmay's teams has won at least 15 Ontario Hockey Association and Ontario Minor Hockey Association championships since 1955.

The First Monarchs were formed in 1946, and over the years there have been many different versions of the Mildmay Monarchs.

2006-07 Monarchs Season
Mildmay finished in 7th place in the North Division with a 6-16-2 record.  The Monarchs then faced off against the Wingham Bulls in the opening round of the "A" playoffs, and were swept in 4 games, ending their season.

Folding
The Monarchs intended to ice a team for the 2007-08 season, and were included when the schedule was made, however, just before the season began, the team announced they were folding due to a lack of players.

Season-by-season record
Note: GP = Games played, W = Wins, L = Losses, T= Tie, OTL = Overtime Losses, Pts = Points, GF = Goals for, GA = Goals against

Related links
Mildmay, Ontario
Western Ontario Athletic Association
WOAA Senior Hockey League

External links
WOAA Website
WOAA Senior Hockey Website

Senior ice hockey teams
Ice hockey teams in Ontario
Defunct ice hockey teams in Canada